Nathaniel Benjamin McKinney (born January 19, 1982) is a Bahamian athlete competing mainly in the 4 × 400 m relay.

At the 2004 Olympic Games McKinney's relay team finished sixth. At the 2005 World Championships, McKinney together with Avard Moncur, Andrae Williams and Chris Brown won the silver medal.

McKinney attended Saint Augustine's College in Raleigh, North Carolina and is a member of Phi Beta Sigma fraternity.

References

External links
 
 Sports Reference

1982 births
Living people
Bahamian male sprinters
Athletes (track and field) at the 2004 Summer Olympics
Olympic athletes of the Bahamas
World Athletics Championships medalists
World Athletics Championships athletes for the Bahamas
Athletes (track and field) at the 2003 Pan American Games
Athletes (track and field) at the 2007 Pan American Games
Pan American Games competitors for the Bahamas